Robertino Canavesio (born 2 April 1993) is an Argentine professional footballer who plays as a centre-back for San Telmo.

Career
Born in Pergamino, Canavesio began playing football in local club Douglas Haig's youth system. He joined Sarmiento in 2011, and soon was selected to play for the senior team in the Primera B Metropolitana. On 5 November 2011 he made his professional debut playing 90 minutes in a 2-0 home won against Acassuso for the Primera B Metropolitana.

After a spell abroad with Parma, Canavesio signed with Grêmio, and played once in Campeonato Gaúcho, a 1–0 away loss to São José-RS. In June 2014, Canavesio returned to Sarmiento to play in the Primera B Nacional by loan until April 2015.

Career statistics

Honours

Club
Sarmiento
Primera B Metropolitana: 2011-12

References

External links

Robertino Canavesio profile. Goal.

Living people
1993 births
Argentine footballers
Argentine expatriate footballers
Association football central defenders
People from Pergamino
Sportspeople from Buenos Aires Province
Club Atlético Douglas Haig players
Club Atlético Sarmiento footballers
All Boys footballers
Parma Calcio 1913 players
Grêmio Foot-Ball Porto Alegrense players
Clube Atlético Tubarão players
Concórdia Atlético Clube players
San Telmo footballers
Argentine expatriate sportspeople in Italy
Argentine expatriate sportspeople in Brazil
Expatriate footballers in Italy
Expatriate footballers in Brazil